This is a list of nationwide public opinion polls that were conducted relating to the Democratic primaries for the 2020 United States presidential election. The persons named in the polls were declared candidates or had received media speculation about their possible candidacy.

Given the large number of candidates, the scores of certain low-polling and infrequently-polled candidates have been combined within the "other" column; their exact scores may be viewed by viewing the footnotes associated with each poll. The polls included are among Democrats or Democrats and Democratic-leaning independents, and do not include Republican-leaning independents. Open-ended polls are included and marked with an asterisk (*), but closed-ended versions of such polls are listed where possible. If multiple versions of polls are provided, the version used for debate qualification is prioritized, then the version among likely voters, then registered voters, then adults.

Background

The Democratic National Committee (DNC) determined that candidates could qualify for the first two Democratic primary debates either by polling at 1% or higher in at least three national or early-state (Iowa, New Hampshire, Nevada, and South Carolina) polls sponsored or conducted by designated organizations (in different regions if by the same organization) published after January 1, 2019, up until June 12, 2019, or by a fundraising threshold requiring at least 65,000 unique donors with at least 200 in 20 different states. If more than 20 candidates met either threshold, candidates meeting both thresholds would be given highest priority for entry into the debates, followed by those with the highest polling average and those with the most donors. The pollsters and sponsors of polls designated for consideration by the DNC were the Associated Press, ABC News, CBS News, CNN, The Des Moines Register, Fox News, the Las Vegas Review-Journal, Monmouth University, NBC News, The New York Times, National Public Radio, Quinnipiac University, Reuters, the University of New Hampshire, USA Today, The Wall Street Journal, The Washington Post, and Winthrop University. Open-ended polls did not count towards the polling threshold. Only top-line polling results counted toward the threshold.

For the third and fourth primary debates, candidates were required to meet both polling and fundraising thresholds. Prior considerations were only polls between June 28 and August 28, 2019 and increased to 4 qualifying polls at 2% support, now excluding surveys sponsored by the Las Vegas Review-Journal and Reuters; the latter requirement was also increased, to 130,000 unique donors with at least 400 in 20 different states.

A total of 29 major candidates declared their candidacies for the primaries, the largest field of presidential primary candidates for any American political party since the modern primaries began in 1972, exceeding the field of 17 major candidates in the 2016 Republican Party presidential primaries.

Other individuals who were included in national Democratic primary polls but did not run for the 2020 nomination included Stacey Abrams, Michael Avenatti, Sherrod Brown, Hillary Clinton, Mark Cuban, Andrew Cuomo, Al Franken, Eric Garcetti, Eric Holder, Tim Kaine, Jason Kander, Joe Kennedy III, John Kerry, Mitch Landrieu, Terry McAuliffe, Chris Murphy, Gavin Newsom, Michelle Obama, Howard Schultz, Oprah Winfrey, and Mark Zuckerberg.

Polling aggregation 
The following graph depicts the standing of each candidate in the poll aggregators from December 2018 to April 2020.

2020

April–August 2020

March 2020

February 2020

January 2020

2019

December 2019

November 2019

October 2019

September 2019

August 2019

July 2019

April–June 2019

March 2019

January–February 2019

Before 2019

October–December 2018

Before October 2018

Polls including Hillary Clinton and Michelle Obama

Head-to-head polls

Favorability ratings 
Net favorability (favorable − unfavorable)

From February 2020 to April 2020

From October 2019 to January 2020

Before October 2019

See also

 Statewide opinion polling for the 2020 Democratic Party presidential primaries
 2020 Democratic National Convention
 Opinion polling for the 2020 Republican Party presidential primaries
 Nationwide opinion polling for the 2020 United States presidential election
 Statewide opinion polling for the 2020 United States presidential election

Notes
Partisan clients

Additional candidates

References

External links
Latest 2020 Democratic Presidential Primary Polls at RealClearPoitics
Primary poll tracker from FiveThirtyEight
Morning Consult weekly Democratic primary tracking poll

2020 United States Democratic presidential primaries
Democratic Party